Articles (arranged alphabetically) related to Mongolia include:

Individual administrative districts are listed in Sums of Mongolia.

0–9

 1932 armed uprising (Mongolia)
 1990 Mongolian democratic revolution

A

 Achit Nuur 
 Adasaurus
 Aero Mongolia 
 Ahmad Fanakati 
 Aimag 
 Aimags of Mongolia 
 Airag 
 Ald (unit)
 Alioramus
 Altai (city) 
 Altai Airport 
 Altaic languages 
 Damdinsüren Altangerel
 Altan Khan 
 Altan Khan of the Khalkha 
 Altan Tobchi 
 Altay Mountains 
 Amarbayasgalant Khiid 
 Rinchinnyamyn Amarjargal
 Ama Kōhei
 Altan Tobchi 
 Amir Qazaghan 
 Anandyn Amar
 Ankle bone shooting
 Antoine Mostaert
 Architecture of Mongolia
 Arkhangai Province 
 Artificial Lake Castle
 Arvaikheer 
 Arvaikheer Airport 
 Asasekiryū Tarō
 Asashoryu Akinori
 Asud

B

 Natsagiin Bagabandi
 Bagakhangai
 Baganuur
 Baiju Noyan
 Balingiin Tserendorj
 Barlas
 Rinchen Barsbold
 Baruun-Urt
 Baruun-Urt Airport
 Baruunturuun, Uvs
 Tsogt Batbayar
 Jambyn Batmönkh
 Ulan Bator
 Batu Khan
 Bayan of the Baarin
 Charles Bawden
 Bayan-Ölgii Province
 Bayangol, Övörkhangai
 Bayangol, Selenge 
 Bayangol, Ulan Bator  
 Bayankhongor
 Bayankhongor Province
 Bayankhongor Airport
 Bayanzürkh
 Sanjaagiin Bayar
 Sorghaghtani Beki
 Best Student of Mongolia award
 Biligtü Khan
 Blue Horde
 Bogd Khan
 Bogd Khan Uul
 Bogdo Zanabazar
 Borjigin
 Bulgan (city)
 Bulgan Airport
 Bulgan Province
 Bulganbaatar
 Gonchigiin Bumtsend
 Burkhan Khaldun
 Buryats
 Buryat language
 Buuz
 Büri
 Byambasuren Davaa
 Börte
 First Mongol invasion of Burma
 Second Mongol invasion of Burma

C

 C1 Television
 Catopsbaatar
 Central Asia
 Chadraabalyn Lodoidamba
 Chagatai Khan
 Chagatai Khanate
 Chahar Mongols
 Camerton (boy band)
 Channel 25 (Mongolia)
 The Cave of the Yellow Dog
 Chingeltei
 Buyant-Ukhaa International Airport
 Choghtu Khong Tayiji
 Choibalsan (city)
 Choibalsan Airport
 Ryenchinii Choinom
 Chormaqan
 Chukchi people
 Chulsanbaatar
 Chuluut River
 Cinema of Mongolia
 Civic Will Republican Party
 Clear script
 Coat of arms of Mongolia
 Constitution of Mongolia
 Communications in Mongolia
 Cretaceous Mongolia 
 Cuisine of Mongolia
 Culture of Mongolia
 Cyrillic script
 Han Chinese in Mongolia
 Khorloogiin Choibalsan
 Roman Catholicism in Mongolia
 The Cave of the Yellow Dog

D

 Dalanzadgad
 Dalanzadgad Airport
 Damdin Sükhbaatar
 Jalkhanz Khutagt Sodnomyn Damdinbazar
 Damdinsüren Altangerel
 Darkhan-Uul Province
 Darkhan (city)
 Darvi, Govi-Altai
 Dashdorjiin Natsagdorj
 Daur people
 Dayan Khan
 Byambasuren Davaa
 Davst, Uvs
 Delger, Govi-Altai
 Delgerkhet
 Delüün
 Demchugdongrub
 Democratic Party (Mongolia)
 Demographics of Mongolia
 Descent from Genghis Khan
 Division of the Mongol Empire
 Dolgorsüren Serjbudee
 Dolgorsüren Sumiyabazar
 Dongxiang language
 Dongxiang people
 Donoi Airport
 Munkhbayar Dorjsuren
 Dornod Province
 Dornogovi Province
 Drogön Chögyal Phagpa
 Dukha
 Dundgovi Province
 Duolun County
 Dzungars
 Düüreg

E

 Economy of Mongolia 
 Economy of the Mongolian People's Republic 
 Eight Banners 
 Tsakhiagiin Elbegdorj
 Elections in Mongolia 
 Eljigidei 
 Epic of King Gesar
 Erdeni Tobchi 
 Nambaryn Enkhbayar 
 Miyeegombyn Enkhbold 
 Mendsaikhany Enkhsaikhan 
 Luvsangiin Erdenechuluun 
 Erdenet 
 Erdene Zuu monastery
 Erdeni Tobchi 
 Ethnic Mongols in China 
 Eznis Airways

F

 Family tree of Genghis Khan 
 Flag of Mongolia 
 Flaming Cliffs 
 Foreign footballers in Mongolia
 Foreign relations of Mongolia 
 Franco-Mongol alliance
 Friends of Mongolia 
 Friendship Peak

G

 Galdan Boshugtu Khan 
 Galsan Tschinag
 Ganbaataryn Tögsbayar 
 Gandantegchinlen Monastery 
 Maidarzhavyn Ganzorig 
 Gelenkhüü
 Peljidiin Genden 
 Genghis Khan 
 Geography of Mongolia 
 Epic of King Gesar 
 Oghul Ghaimish 
 Gobi Desert 
 Gobi Gurvansaikhan National Park
 Golden Horde 
 Gonchigiin Bumtsend 
 Öndör Gongor
 Government Palace (Mongolia)
 Govi-Altai Province 
 Govisümber Province 
 Goyol Fashion Festival
 Greater Mongolia 
 Gurvan Saikhan Uul
 Jügderdemidiin Gürragchaa
 Güyük Khan

H

 Harumafuji Kōhei
 Blue Horde 
 Golden Horde 
 Hakuho Sho 
 Han Chinese in Mongolia 
 Haner language
 Hans-Peter Vietze
 Harhiraa 
 Hasagt Hairhan 
 Hasar
 History of Mongolia 
 History of modern Mongolia 
 Hoelun 
 Hohhot 
 Hong Bok-won 
 Hong Dagu 
 Hulagu Khan 
 Hu'iten Peak  
 Mongolian horse 
 Przewalski's Horse 
 The Secret History of the Mongols 
 White Horde

I

 Ikh Khorig
 Ilkhanate
 Inner Mongolia
 Institute of finance and economics of Mongolia
 Mongol invasions of India
 Islam in Mongolia

J

 Jalkhanz Khutagt Sodnomyn Damdinbazar
 Jambyn Batmönkh
 Jamsrangiin Tseveen
 Jamtsyn Davaajav
 Jamuqa
 Janlavyn Narantsatsralt
 Jasagh 
 Jebe 
 Jebtsundamba Khutuktu 
 Jigjidiin Mönkhbat
 Jinong 
 Jochi
 Jügderdemidiin Gürragchaa
 Mongol invasion of Java

K

 Battle of the Kalka River 
 Battle of Khalkhin Gol
 Kalmyk language 
 Karakorum 
 Khalkha 
 Khalkha Mongolian
 Khalkhyn Gol 
 Khan 
 Khangai Mountains 
 Khan Ho'hii  
 Khanui River 
 Khar Nuur, Khovd 
 Khar Nuur, Zavkhan 
 Kharkhorin 
 Kharkhorin Sum Airport 
 Khatanbaatar Magsarjav
 Mandukhai Khatun
 
 Khentii Mountains 
 Khentii Province 
 Kherlen River 
 Khong Tayiji 
 Ikh Khorig
 Khorloogiin Choibalsan 
 Khoroo
 Khovd Province 
 Khovd (city) 
 Lake Khövsgöl
 Khövsgöl Province 
 State Great Khural
 Khüiten Peak
 Kublai Khan 
 Kulan 
 Kurultai
 Kyokushuzan
 Kyokutenhou Masaru 
 Köke Temür 
 Pyotr Kozlov
 Khaidu the borjigon mongol
 Kaidu
 Kharchin

L

 Chadraabalyn Lodoidamba 
 Owen Lattimore
 Leagues of China 
 LGBT rights in Mongolia 
 Liao dynasty 
 Ligdan Khan 
 List of Mongol rulers 
 List of Mongol states
 List of airports in Mongolia 
 List of cities in Mongolia
 List of medieval Mongolian tribes and clans
 List of museums in Mongolia 
 List of national parks of Mongolia 
 List of newspapers in Mongolia 
 List of political parties in Mongolia 
 List of universities in Mongolia 
 Luvsangiin Erdenechuluun

M

 MIAT Mongolian Airlines
 Maidarzhavyn Ganzorig 
 Manchukuo 
 Mandalgovi 
 Mandukhai Khatun 
 Marco Polo 
 Mausoleum of Genghis Khan 
 Mendsaikhany Enkhsaikhan 
 Mengjiang 
 Migjid Janraisig 
 Military of Mongolia 
 Mishig Sonompil 
 Miyeegombyn Enkhbold 
 Mongol Castle
 Mongol Empire 
 Mongol Nation 
 Mongol bow 
 Mongol conquest of Tibet 
 Mongol invasion of Central Asia 
 Mongol invasion of China 
 Mongol invasions and conquests 
 Mongol invasions of Japan 
 Mongol invasion of Java 
 Mongol invasions of Korea 
 Mongol invasion of Rus 
 Mongol invasion of Volga Bulgaria 
 Mongol military tactics and organization 
 Mongol Post
 Mongolia 
 Mongolia under Qing rule
 Mongolia under Yuan rule
 Mongolian Death Worm 
 Mongolian Democratic Union 
 Mongolian Human Resources Institute
 Mongolian manuscript maps
 Mongolian Nuclear-Weapons-Free Status 
 Mongolian People's Army 
 Mongolian People's Party 
 Mongolian People's Republic
 Mongolian People's Revolutionary Party (2010) 
 Mongolian armour 
 Mongolian cuisine 
 Mongolian horse 
 Mongolian language 
 Mongolian name 
 Mongolian script 
 Mongolian writing systems 
 Mongolian tögrög 
 Mongolic languages 
 Mongols 
 Mongolyn Skautyn Kholboo 
 Mongolian tögrög
 Morin khuur
 Antoine Mostaert 
 Music of Mongolia 
 Möngke Khan 
 Mörön (city) 
 Mörön Airport

N

 Dashdorjiin Natsagdorj 
 Janlavyn Narantsatsralt 
 Mongolian Nuclear-Weapons-Free Status 
 Naadam 
 Nalaikh 
 Nambaryn Enkhbayar
 National Anthem of Mongolia
 National University of Mongolia 
 Natsagiin Bagabandi 
 Negdel
 Nemegtbaatar 
 Nessovbaatar 
 Nogai Khan 
 Nomads 
 Nyam-Osoryn Tuyaa 
 Tsendiin Nyamdorj

O

 Punsalmaagiin Ochirbat 
 Oghul Qaimish
 Oirat language
 Oirats 
 Onon River 
 Onon, Khentii
 Ulaanbaatar Opera House 
 Ordos Desert 
 Orkhon Province
 Orkhon Valley 
 Orkhon River 
 Orkhon script 
 Nyam-Osoryn Tuyaa 
 Outer Mongolia 
 Overtone singing  
 Ovoo

Ö

 Ögedei Khan 
 Ömnögovi Province 
 Öndör Gongor
 Övörkhangai Province
 Örüg Temür Khan

P

 Drogön Chögyal Phagpa 
 Pax Mongolica 
 Peljidiin Genden
 'Phags-pa script 
 Politics of Mongolia 
 Nicholas Poppe
 President of Mongolia 
 Prime Minister of Mongolia 
 Proto-Mongols  
 Przewalski's Horse 
 Public holidays in Mongolia 
 Punsalmaagiin Ochirbat 
 Puxian Wannu

Q

 Qara Khitai
 Qazan Khan ibn Yasaur
 Oghul Qaimish
 Amir Qazaghan
 Qing dynasty
 Qinghai
 Queen Anu
 Qutlugh Khwaja

R

 Rabban Bar Sauma
 Emperor Renzong of Yuan China 
 Rehe 
 Republican Party (Mongolia) 
 Renchinlkhümbe, Khövsgöl 
 Rinchinnyamyn Amarjargal 
 Roman Catholicism in Mongolia 
 Roman Ungern von Sternberg 
 Ryenchinii Choinom

S

 Sagsai 
 Sainshand 
 Sangiin Dalai nuur
 Sartuul
 Sayan Mountains 
 Isaac Jacob Schmidt
 Sculpture of Mongolia 
 The Secret History of the Mongols 
 Selenga 
 Selenge Province 
 Selenge River 
 Dolgorsüren Serjbudee
 Shagai
 Shankh Monastery 
 Sharga, Govi-Altai 
 Silk Road 
 Mongolyn Skautyn Kholboo  
 Sloanbaataridae 
 Songino Khairkhan 
 Mishig Sonompil 
 Sorghaghtani Beki 
 Soyombo script 
 Soyombo symbol 
 State Great Khural 
 State of Dogs 
 Storm Over Asia
 The Story of the Weeping Camel
 Suiyuan 
 Damdin Sükhbaatar 
 Sükhbaatar Province 
 Sükhbaatar (district) 
 Sükhbaatar's mausoleum 
 Sükhbaataryn Yanjmaa 
 Sum (country subdivision) 
 Sums of Mongolia 
 Dolgorsüren Sumiyabazar

T

 Tavan Bogd Uul
 Tabun-Khara-Obo crater 
 Tamir River 
 Tannu-Ola Mountains 
 Tartary 
 Tatars 
 Köke Temür 
 Tengri 
 Tengriism 
 Terkhiin Tsagaan Nuur 
 The Travels of Marco Polo 
 Tibetan Buddhism 
 Timeline of Mongolian history 
 Timur 
 Tolui 
 Ganbaatar Tögsbayar 
 Traditional Mongolian medicine
 Trans-Mongolian Railway
 Transportation in Mongolia 
 Treaty of friendship and alliance between the Government of Mongolia and Tibet 
 Tsagaan Sar 
 Jamsrangiin Tseveen
 Tuul River 
 Tuvans 
 Nyam-Osoryn Tuyaa 
 Töregene Khatun 
 Töv Province 
 Yumjaagiin Tsedenbal
 TV5 Mongolia

U

 UB Post 
 Ugsarmal bair
 Ulaanbaatar Opera House 
 Ulaangom 
 Ulan Bator 
 Uliastai 
 National University of Mongolia 
 Roman Ungern von Sternberg 
 Uskhal Khan 
 Uvs Nuur 
 Uvs Province 
 Uyghur people
 Uyghur language

Ü

 Ünee tugaluulakh

V

 Vanchinbalyn Gularans
 Vanchinbalyn Injinash
 Vowel harmony

W

 Wang Toghtua Bukha
 Western Xia
 White Horde
 Wind Horse
 List of World Heritage Sites in Mongolia

X

Y

 Yam (route)
 Sükhbaataryn Yanjmaa 
 Yassa
 Yesugei
 Yi Ja-chun 
 Yolyn Am
 Yuan dynasty 
 Yumjaagiin Tsedenbal 
 Yümjiriin Mönkh-Amgalan
 Yurt

Z

 Zanabazar
 Zaisan Memorial 
 Zavkhan Province 
 Zaya Pandit
 Zevegiin Oidov
 Zorigtbaataryn Enkhzorig
 Zud
 Zuunmod
 Züüngovi, Uvs
 Züünkhangai, Uvs

See also
 Lists of country-related topics – similar lists for other countries

 
Mongolia